Raja Isteri Pengiran Anak Saleha Hospital, commonly abbreviated as RIPAS Hospital, is the main and largest hospital in Brunei. It is the primary referral hospital, as well as a teaching hospital for medical and nursing students mainly from Universiti Brunei Darussalam, the only university in the country providing such courses. The hospital is funded by the government and administered under the Ministry of Health. It was officially opened on 28 August 1984. The hospital accommodates 1260 beds and has 257 doctors.

Location 
The site is also located close to the bank of the Kedayan River, which provides water transport access to the populaces of Kampong Ayer on the Brunei River.

See also 
List of hospitals in Brunei

References

External links
Raja Isteri Pengiran Anak Saleha Hospital on the Ministry of Health's website

Hospital buildings completed in 1984
Hospitals in Brunei
Hospitals established in 1984
1984 establishments in Brunei